Apolipoprotein C-I is a protein component of lipoproteins that in humans is encoded by the APOC1 gene.

Function 

The protein encoded by this gene is a member of the apolipoprotein C family. This gene is expressed primarily in the liver, and it is activated when monocytes differentiate into macrophages. Alternatively spliced transcript variants have been found for this gene, but the biological validity of some variants has not been determined.

Apolipoprotein C-I has a length of 57 amino acids normally found in plasma and responsible for the activation of esterified lecithin cholesterol with an important role in the exchange of esterified cholesterol between lipoproteins and in removal of cholesterol from tissues. Its main function is inhibition of cholesteryl ester transfer protein (CETP), probably by altering the electric charge of HDL molecules.

During fasting (like other apolipoprotein C), it is found primarily within HDL, while after a meal it is found on the surface of other lipoproteins. When proteins rich in triglycerides like chylomicrons and VLDL are broken down, this apoprotein is transferred again to HDL.  It is one of the most positively charged proteins in the human body.

Pseudogene 

A pseudogene of this gene is located 4 kb downstream from the apoC-I gene in the same orientation on chromosome 19, where both reside within an apolipoprotein gene cluster.  This pseudogene, which was also reported to have been present in Denisovans and Neandertals, originated from two separate events.  Following the divergence of New World monkeys from the human lineage, the apoC-I gene was duplicated. Old World monkeys and great apes other than humans have been shown to have two active genes.  One of the duplicates encodes a basic protein designated apoC-IB that is orthologous to human apolipoprotein C-I.  The other encodes an acidic protein, apoC-IA, that is orthologous to the virtual protein encoded by the pseudogene.  The pseudogenization event occurred sometime between the divergence of bonobos and chimpanzees from the human lineage and the arrival of Denisovans and Neandertals.  The pseudogene is due to a change in a single nucleotide in the codon for the penultimate amino acid, i.e. glutamine, in the signal sequence, resulting in a stop codon.

Interactive pathway map

References

Further reading

External links 
 
 PDBe-KB provides an overview of all the structure information available in the PDB for Human Apolipoprotein C-I 

Apolipoproteins